The Tooloom Creek, a perennial stream of the Clarence River catchment, is located in the Northern Rivers region in the state of New South Wales, Australia.

Location and features
The river descends  over its  course.

The Summerland Way crosses the river west of Woodenbong.

See also

 Rivers of New South Wales
 List of rivers of New South Wales (L-Z)
 List of rivers of Australia

References

 

Northern Rivers
Rivers of New South Wales